For Gentlemen Only is a Canadian short drama film, directed by Michael Scott and released in 1976. Produced by the National Film Board of Canada, the film stars Ed McNamara and Hugh Webster as two retired men living in a men's rooming house, who are struggling with change when the home is acquired by a new owner who plans to rent rooms to women for the first time.

The film won three awards at the 27th Canadian Film Awards, for Best TV Drama, Best Actor in a Non-Feature (shared between McNamara and Webster) and Best Screenplay for a Non-Feature (David King).

References

External links

1976 films
Canadian drama television films
National Film Board of Canada short films
Canadian drama short films
1970s Canadian films